The Réseau Liberté-Québec (English: Québec Freedom Network) is a non-profit organization aiming to promote libertarian views and ideals in the Canadian province of Quebec. The group, founded during the summer of 2010 by Joanne Marcotte, Éric Duhaime, Roy Eappen, Gérard Laliberté, Ian Sénéchal and Guillaume Leduc, has been compared to the American conservative advocacy movement Tea Party.

References

Political movements in Canada
Politics of Quebec
Right-wing populism in Canada
2010 establishments in Quebec